Vsevolod Bobrov is an  in the Russian Navy. Built by the Severnaya Verf Shipyard from 2013 to 2021, the ship is used for transporting dry cargo, water, and ammunition, as well as providing search-and-rescue, medical support, and towing capabilities. The ship was named after the Soviet football and ice hockey player Vsevolod Bobrov.

Characteristics 
The Vsevolod Bobrov is the second ship in the Project 23120 Elbrus class, and is designated as a logistics support vessel in the Russian Navy. It has a bulbous bow and is made of a steel hull which is ice-strengthened to be compliant with the Arc4 ice class. It has a crew of 27 and is capable of carrying 43 passengers.

The ship has a displacement of roughly 10,000 t and can transport 2,000 t of cargo in up to 40 shipping containers. There are also two inflatable boats for transportation or conducting rescue missions, and the Vsevolod Bobrov is capable of acting as a mothership for smaller submersibles conducting underwater search-and-rescue missions.

The ship is powered by four diesel engines which provide  of power. It has bow-mounted rudder propellers and thrusters, as well as a positioning system which allows the ship to maintain its position in heavy sea state.

The navigation bridge is located on the top of the deck towards the front of the ship, and has X-band and S-band radars as well as GLONASS capabilities. There is a medical bay with six beds, firefighting equipment, and a decompression chamber for divers. It also has a small flight deck which can host two Kamov Ka-27 helicopters.

History

Construction 
The Vsevolod Bobrov was designed by JSC Spetssudoproekt Design Bureau in St. Petersburg and built at the shipyard in Severnaya Verf. The order for three Elbrus-class vessels was placed in June 2012, and construction began on Vsevolod Bobrov in 2013. Its hull was completed in March 2016, and it was launched in November 2016. In 2021, the vessel underwent sea trials in the Baltic Sea for roughly a month, testing its systems with a trial crew of around 100 in addition to its crew of 27. The vessel was officially accepted into the Russian Navy on 8 August 2021 by the Commission for State Acceptance of Ships.

Black Sea Fleet 
On 21 August 2021, the St. Andrew's flag was raised aboard the Vsevolod Bobrov in a ceremony with Vice Admiral Igor Mukhametshin at Kronstadt. The ship set sail to join the Black Sea Fleet at the end of August along with the mine defense ship , and arrived at its permanent base of Novorossiysk Naval Base in January 2022.

2022 Russian invasion of Ukraine 
On the night of 11–12 May, Vsevolod Bobrov was transiting in the Black Sea towards Snake Island. According to Ukrainian military intelligence sources, a major fire broke out on the ship overnight which caused damage and forced some or all of the crew to evacuate, and was the result of an unconfirmed Ukrainian attack on the ship. However, no evidence for this claim was brought by either Ukrainian source, and later reporting by Radio Svoboda and Russian Navy sources appear to indicate that the Vsevolod Bobrov returned to port in Sevastopol without suffering any major or visible damage by 14 May.

References 

Auxiliary ships of the Russian Navy
Maritime incidents in 2022
2021 ships
Ships involved in the 2022 Russian invasion of Ukraine